Cahir GAA is a Gaelic Athletic Association club in the parish of Cahir, County Tipperary, Ireland. It's a dual club, with more success in football.

History
Cahir has fielded GAA teams since 1885.

Football 
Cahir fields Gaelic Football teams at both Senior and Junior A level. Their greatest and only real success at senior level came in 2003 when they defeated Ardfinnan to claim the County Championship.

Notable players
 Liam Casey

 Johnny Smacks
 Johnny B

Former Tipp senior football captain Robbie Costigan
Former Tipp & Waterford senior hurler Andy Maloney

Honours
 Tipperary Senior Football Championship (1) 2003
 South Tipperary Senior Football Championship (3) 1959 (as Cahir Slashers), 2001, 2003
 Tipperary Intermediate Football Championship (2) 1979, 1998
 South Tipperary Intermediate Football Championship (2) 1979, 1998
 Tipperary Junior A Football Championship (3): 1952, 1955, 1958 (all as Cahir Slashers)
 South Tipperary Junior A Football Championship (5): 1944, 1952, 1955, 1958 (all as Cahir Slashers), 2000
 Tipperary Junior B Football Championship (1) 1995
 South Tipperary Junior B Football Championship (1) 1995
 South Tipperary Under-21 Football Championship (3) 1974 (with Moyle Rovers, 1996, 2019
 Tipperary Under-21 B Football Championship (3) 1989, 2014, 2016,
 South Tipperary Under-21 B Football Championship (4) 1989, 1995, 2014, 2016,2017
Tipperary Minor A Football (1) 1996
 South Tipperary Minor A Football Championship (3) 1996,2000,2018
 Tipperary Minor B Football Championship (2) 2004, 2008
 South Tipperary Minor B Football Championship (4) 1992, 2004, 2008, 2012

Hurling 
Cahir fields Junior Hurling teams. Past players of note include, Andrew Moloney and Richie Quirke.

Honours
 South Tipperary Intermediate Hurling Championship (5) 1969, 1987, 1988, 1995, 1996
 South Tipperary Junior A Hurling Championship (2) 1967, 1977
 South Tipperary Junior B Hurling Championship (3) 1995, 2012,2020
 South Tipperary Under-21 A Hurling Championship (2) 1969, 1984 (with Ballybacon-Grange)
 Tipperary Under-21 B Hurling Championship (1) 2000,
 South Tipperary Under-21 B Hurling Championship (2) 1996, 2000,2017
 South Tipperary Minor Hurling Championship (1) 1944 (as Cahir Slashers)  
 South Tipperary Minor B Hurling Championship (3) 1984 (with Ballybacon-Grange), 1995, 2000,2020

Ladies football 
The Ladies Football Club in Cahir is one of the most successful in Tipperary, fielding teams in U12, U14, U16, Minor, Junior and Intermediate. In 2004 the Cahir U14 Girls won the Féile Peil Na nÓg Division 3 final. In 2007 the Cahir U12 Girls won the Health Service Executive (HSE) sponsored Community Games national final. Also in 2007, 2008 and 2009 the Cahir U14 Ladies have reached the Féile Final for three years in a row, narrowly missing out on the All-Ireland title each year. In 2010, the U14 girls won the Division 3 final, meeting Shane O’Neill's of Camlough, County Armagh in the final. The Cahir Ladies have received county titles in the 'A' division in every age group. Throughout the years, they have fielded many county players at U14, U16, Minor and Senior levels. In 2010, there were four U14 county players, seven U16 county players, two Minor county player and four Senior county players.

Camogie 
The Camogie Club in Cahir holds many County Titles. Recently the U12 and U14 teams have been brought up to the 'A' division. The U12 have county 'A' titles and the U14 narrowly missing out. The Club currently has three U14 county players. Also in 2009 the U14 girls team won the HSE Community Games County Title. They got to the Munster Final which they lost by one point to Doughlas of Cork who went on to win the National Title. In 2010 the U14 girls team won the HSE Community Games County title and the Munster final. They went on to the national finals where they defeated Claregalway in the semi-final and Lucan Sarsfields in the final, becoming All-Ireland Champions.

Sources
Official Cahir GAA club website.

References

Gaelic games clubs in County Tipperary
Gaelic football clubs in County Tipperary
Hurling clubs in County Tipperary
Cahir